Roughgarden is a surname. Notable people with the surname include:

Joan Roughgarden (born 1946), American ecologist and evolutionary biologist
Tim Roughgarden (born 1975), computer scientist